Prasophyllum fitzgeraldii, commonly known as FitzGerald's leek orchid, is a species of orchid endemic to South Australia. It has a single tube-shaped leaf and up to thirty five green or reddish-brown flowers with a pink to purple labellum. It was previously thought to also occur in Victoria.

Description
As with others in the genus, the flowers are inverted so that the labellum is above the column rather than below it. The upturned part is crinkled and there is a fleshy, purplish-green callus in the centre and extending past the bend. Flowering occurs in October and November.

Taxonomy and naming
Prasophyllum fitzgeraldii was first formally described in 1909 by Richard Sanders Rogers and Joseph Maiden and the description was published in Transactions, proceedings and report, Royal Society of South Australia from a specimen collected in the Sandy Creek Conservation Park. The specific epithet (fitzgeraldii) honours the orchidologist Robert D. FitzGerald.

Distribution and habitat
FitzGerald's leek orchid grows in grassland, heath and forest in the south-east of South Australia. It was previously thought to also occur in Victoria, but the plants growing there are now thought to be of Prasophyllum roseum, a species described in 2017.

References

External links 
 

fitzgeraldii
Flora of South Australia
Plants described in 1909
Endemic orchids of Australia